Medeni mjesec is a 1983 Croatian film directed by Nikola Babić.

References

External links
 

1983 films
Croatian crime drama films
1980s Croatian-language films
Yugoslav crime drama films
Films based on Croatian novels